Lake Viking is an unincorporated community and census-designated place (CDP) in Daviess County, Missouri, United States. The population was 486 at the 2020 census.

Geography
The Lake Viking CDP is located southwest of the center of Daviess County, around a reservoir named Lake Viking, an impoundment on South Big Creek, a tributary of the Grand River. The CDP extends southwest as far as the village of Altamont.

Demographics

References

External links
Lake Viking Association

Census-designated places in Daviess County, Missouri
Census-designated places in Missouri